Dochen Tso
or Duoqing Cuo is a high-altitude lake in Yadong County in the Tibet region of China.

Location 
The rivers Nimu Maqu and Qionggui Zangbu are the primary sources of water for the lake, and the lake's water is discharged into Galacuo, which is located 9 km further to the north.

References

Lakes of Tibet
Yadong County
Shigatse